"Beautiful Girls" is the last song from Van Halen's second album, Van Halen II, from 1979. The song was a concert staple during their tour for this album. The song was originally titled "Bring on the Girls" when it was recorded for the 25-song Warner Brothers demo, but the title and lyrics were changed accordingly.

Reception
Cash Box said that "David Lee Roth belts out the lead vocal with a sense of good humor rarely seen in heavy metal."  Record World said that Van Halen's "trademark raunchy guitar is accompanied by carefree, youthful vocals."  Author Chuck Klosterman ranked it the 20th-best Van Halen song, calling it the "supernatural definition of musical immediacy."

Notes

Further reading

Van Halen songs
1979 songs
Song recordings produced by Ted Templeman
Songs written by Eddie Van Halen
Songs written by Alex Van Halen
Songs written by Michael Anthony (musician)
Songs written by David Lee Roth
Warner Records singles